Paul Bernard (1827–1879) was a French composer.

His best remembered work is the song "Ça fait peur aux oiseaux" from the operetta Bredouille, to a libretto by Galoppe d'Onquaire (1805-1867).

Songs composed my Paul Bernard: 

A
Air danois, Op.89
L'amour captif
B
Badinage, Op.27
La ballade du page, Op.47
Ballade, Op.110
Barcarolle et chanson de 'Fortunio', Op.61
C
Ça fait peur aux oiseaux, Op.108
Capriccio, Op.104
La carriole
La chanson du puits
Le chant des feuilles, Op.35
Charmant caprice
Consolation, Op.66
D
Le départ des conscrits, Op.36
E
Les elfes, Op.25
Essais pour le piano
3 Etudes Caractéristiques
Evohé
F
Fantaisie de salon No.1 sur 'Le château de la Barbe-bleue', Op.20
La faucheuse
Fleurs et pleurs, Op.36
Fontaine aux perles, Op.31
G
Grande valse de salon, Op.86
H
L'hirondelle du clocher, Op.33
I
Impromptu, Op.111
L
Lolita
M
Marche aux lampions
Marche ottomane, Op.100
N
La noisette
O
L'oiselet et l'amour
P
Piano Sonata, Op.28
Plaintes à l'amour
Q
Quand on s'adore
R
Romanza, Op.106
S
Sérénade, Op.39
Souvenez-vous, Op.88
Styrienne originale variée, Op.93
Suite concertante sur 'L'oca del Cairo', Op.91
Suite Pittoresque No.1
2 Suites concertantes sur 'Don Juan', Op.85
2 Suites concertantes sur 'Mignon', Op.90
Sylvana, Op.103
T
Tarentelle, Op.101
Transcription variée sur 'La légende de Saint Nicolas', Op.83

References

1827 births
1879 deaths
19th-century French composers